Vostochny is an urban-type settlement in Batken Region of Kyrgyzstan. The settlement is governed by the town council of Sülüktü. Its population was 8,611 in 2021.

Population

References

External links 
 Gorod 36-53 (Informal site of the town Sulyukta)
 Satellite map at Maplandia.com

Populated places in Batken Region